The Cerro Colorado Mountains are a low mountain range in southern Pima County, Arizona, USA. The highest point of the range is Colorado Peak. The range consists of a NNW–SSE trending ridge with several shorter ridges extending off the main ridge to the ENE.

The Las Guijas Mountains lie  to the southwest. The Sierra Colorado silver mining district lies in the hills between the Sierra Colorados and the Las Guijas ranges. Arivaca Junction in the Santa Cruz River valley lies  due east. The Santa Rita Mountains are across the Santa Cruz Valley to the east.

Arivaca Road, which connects Arivaca Junction on the east with Arivaca to the southwest at the south end of the Las Guijas Mountains, runs through the valley on the southeast of the Cerro Colorados.

Cerro Colorado mine
The Cerro Colorado Mine (Heintzelman Mine; Silver Queen Mine) was discovered around 1750 by Spanish explorers. The mine was in production from 1856 to 1884 and from 1901 to 1937. Early production was by the Sonora Exploration & Mining Company, which was then owned by Charles Poston and Samuel Colt. Production was some 3,000 tons of ore which averaged about 100 ounces of silver per ton, 0.1 ounces of gold per ton and minor amounts of lead and copper.

The highest grade ore on record was over 12,000 ounces of silver per ton, with an average mined  grade in 1859  of  770 oz/t; the average since that year is around 225 oz/t. Ore was mined above 350 feet of depth.

References

History of Pima County, Arizona
Mining in Arizona
Mountain ranges of Arizona
Mountain ranges of Pima County, Arizona
Silver mines in the United States